Michaela Krutská (born January 21, 1985) is a Czech pair skater. With Marek Sedlmajer, she is the 2001 Ondrej Nepela Memorial bronze medalist and 2001 Czech national champion. The pair placed 11th at the 2001 European Championships in Bratislava, Slovakia. After retiring from competition, she began performing with Roger Lubicz-Sawicki in the Holiday on Ice show. She also appeared in two seasons of Gwiazdy tańczą na lodzie (the Polish version of Dancing on Ice) – partnering Przemysław Babiarz in season 1 and Michał Milowicz in season 3.

Programs 
(with Sedlmajer)

Competitive highlights
With Sedlmajer

References

External links
 

1985 births
Czech female pair skaters
Living people